is a double A-side single featuring the opening and ending theme songs from the Japanese anime series Kirarin Revolution.

Background and release

Morning Musume member Koharu Kusumi starred in Kirarin Revolution as the main character, Kirari Tsukishima. Cute member Mai Hagiwara had a guest role on the show from June 2007 to September 2007 as Hikaru Mizuki, an original character made for the show.

In addition to "Hana o Pūn" and "Futari wa NS" being released as the characters' duets in the show, "Hana o Pūn" is the fourth opening and sixth ending theme song to Kirarin Revolution. "Futari wa NS", the seventh ending theme song to Kirarin Revolution, was included as the second A-side and is also performed by Kira Pika. The song is a ballad. To promote the single, Oha Suta aired live-action episodic segments titled "Kira Pika Story" from July 4, 2007 to July 18, 2007, with the actresses reprising their roles from the show.

The single was released on August 1, 2007 under the Zetima label. 
A video single, referred as a "Single V", was released on August 8, 2007.

Music video

Music videos for both songs were released with the video single. The music video for "Hana o Pūn" shows Kusumi and Hagiwara dressed up as their characters, Kirari Tsukishima and Hikaru Mizuki. The back-up dancers wore pig noses to emphasize the "nose" theme. The dance's choreography focuses on thumbing the nose in triumph during the chorus.

Performances

A promotional concert event titled "Kira Pika: Hana o Pūn Summer Live" was held on July 26, 2007. Both songs were performed during Kirarin Revolution'''s final concert event on May 4, 2009, where Hagiwara appeared as a special guest.

After Kirarin Revolution ended, Kusumi and Hagiwara briefly reunited on Momoiro Clover Z's variety show  on November 19, 2015, and performed "Futari wa NS."

Reception

The CD single debuted at #9 in the Oricon Weekly Singles Chart. The video single charted at #27 on the Oricon Weekly DVD Charts.

Editors at Barks praised "Hana o Pūn" for its catchy melody and called it a "stand-out" of the summer 2007 season, attributing part of its quirkiness to the music video. The song's catchiness was compared to "Odoru Pompokolin" from Chibi Maruko-chan. Barks'' also reviewed "Futari wa NS" favorably and mentioned that it showed a different side to Kusumi and Hagiwara.

Track listing

Single

DVD single

Charts

Single

DVD single

References 

2007 singles
2007 songs
Anime songs
Children's television theme songs
Kirarin Revolution
Hello! Project songs
Animated series theme songs
Zetima Records singles